Akhori is a village in Bhilangana block of Tehri Garhwal district, Uttarakhand, India. As of 2011, it has a population of 1,623 people, in 324 households, and 2 primary school , 1 highschool and 1 Intermediate College. The village lands cover an area of 326.8 hectares. The nearest major town is Ghansali.

 

Akhori village code is 249155. Akhori village is located in Ghansali tehsil of Tehri Garhwal district in Uttarakhand, India. It is situated 30km away from sub-district headquarter Ghansali (tehsildar office) and 90km away from district headquarter New Tehri. As per 2009 stats, Akhori village is also a gram panchayat.

The total geographical area of village is 326.8 hectares. Akhori has a total population of 1,623peoples, out of which male population is 727 while female population is 896. Literacy rate of akhori village is 87.42% out 100% . There are about 324 houses in akhori village. Pincode of akhori village locality is 249155.

Tehri is nearest town to akhori for all major economic activities, which is approximately 90km away.

References

Villages in Tehri Garhwal district